S. C. Dharmadhikari (Satyaranjan C. Dharmadhikari) is an Indian Judge. He is the former Judge of Bombay High Court.

Early life 
Born on 26 January 1960 in a family of lawyers. His father was late Justice C. S. Dharmadhikari. He has done B.Com. and LL.B. from Bombay University and enrolled as an Advocate on 28 June 1983.

Judge 
He has elevated as an Additional Judge at Bombay High Court on 14 November 2003. He has resigned on 15 February 2020 from his position over transfer to Madhya Pradesh High Court citing personal reasons. He was the senior-most Judge at Bombay Court at the time of his resignation.

References 

Indian judges
1960 births
Living people
Judges of the Bombay High Court